Zaccaria Betti (7 July 1732-1788) was an Italian poet, writing about agricultural topics.

Born in Verona, he began studying under the Jesuits in Brescia, but illness forced him to finish his studies in Verona. His main poem was del Baco da Seta, canti 4, con annotazione (dedicated to Marchese Giambattista Spolverini, 1736), mimicking the work Sereide by Emanuele Tesauro. Betti's second work was a poem titled la Cascina. He was an honorary member of the Accademia dei Georgofili of Florence.

References

External links 
 

1732 births
1788 deaths
18th-century Italian writers
18th-century Italian male writers
Italian poets
Italian agronomists
People from Verona